The Inhini River is a tributary of the Iskut River in the northwest part of the province of British Columbia, Canada, in Cassiar Land District.

The river's watershed's land cover is classified as 26.2% shrubland, 23.7% barren, 20.7% snow/glacier, 16.2% conifer forest, and small amounts of other cover.

The Inhini River is in the traditional territory of the Tlingit, specifically the Shtax'héen Ḵwáan, commonly known as the Stikine River people. It is also in the asserted traditional territory of the Tahltan First Nation and Iskut First Nation, of the Tahltan people.

Geography
The Inhini River originates in two forks near the border of Alaska. The longer eastern fork flows from the glacial meltwaters of Mount Rastus and Simma Mountain, close to the source of Simma Creek, a tributary of the Craig River. This fork flows for about  before being joined by the west fork, which flows from the glacial meltwaters of Mount Fawcett, an Alaska–British Columbia boundary peak.

The mainstem Inhini River flows north between Inhini Mountain and Mount Whipple, then between Fizzle Mountain and Snowy Mountain, collecting a number of unnamed tributary streams. It becomes a braided river after entering the floodplain of the Iskut River.

See also
 List of British Columbia rivers

References 

Cassiar Land District
Rivers of British Columbia
Rivers of the Boundary Ranges
Stikine Country
Tahltan
Tlingit